Ernst Ludwig Franke (23 August 1886 – 28 December 1948) was an Austrian painter. His work was part of the painting event in the art competition at the 1936 Summer Olympics.

References

1886 births
1948 deaths
20th-century Austrian painters
Austrian male painters
Olympic competitors in art competitions
Artists from Vienna
20th-century Austrian male artists